The 1916 Baylor Bears football team was an American football team that represented Baylor University 1st season  as a member of the Southwest Conference (SWC) during the 1916 college football season. In its third season under head coach Charles Mosley, the team compiled a Baylor claims a 9–1 record (3–1 against SWC opponents) and outscored opponents by a total of 316 to 27. Baylor claims a conference championship for the 1916 season.

Schedule

References

Baylor
Baylor Bears football seasons
Baylor Bears football